OK Computer is an Indian absurdist philosophical science fiction comedy television series on Disney+ Hotstar created and directed by Pooja Shetty and Neil Pagedar, who also wrote the script along with Anand Gandhi. Gandhi and his team also produced the series through the studio Memesys Culture Lab. The series stars Radhika Apte, Vijay Varma, Rasika Dugal, Jackie Shroff, Kani Kusruti, and Ullas Mohan and began streaming on Disney+ Hotstar from 26 March 2021.

The title is a reference to a line from the Douglas Adams' novel, The Hitchhiker's Guide to the Galaxy, with the phrase 'OK Computer' being popularized by the English rock band Radiohead.

Synopsis 
The year is 2031. In a New India - of towering smart holograms and drone superhighways - hard boiled Cyber Crime detective Saajan Kundu is called out of retirement when a self-driving taxi  is hacked and ordered to kill an anonymous human victim. Saajan begrudgingly joins forces with  estranged partner Laxmi Suri, a whip-smart AI scientist, to comb the modern backwaters of Goa  for the killer. Their search ultimately brings them face to face with a distinctly unusual suspect -  a genial government-funded advanced robot called Ajeeb. While investigating Ajeeb, however,  Saajan and Laxmi find themselves grappling with conflicting questions. Is Ajeeb even capable of  harming anyone? If one artificial intelligence manipulates another into committing a crime, who  is really to blame? Could a human being be the real mastermind? And most importantly, if AI is  the final frontier of evolution, will they do to us what we’ve done to other species?

Cast 
 Vijay Varma as Saajan Kundu
 Radhika Apte as Laxmi Suri 
 Kani Kusruti as Monalisa Paul
Ullas Mohan as Ajeeb
 Neil Pagedar as Ajeeb's voice
Jackie Shroff as Pushpak Shakur
Sarang Sathaye as Ashfaq Auliya
 Vibha Chibber as DCP DCP
 Ratnabali Bhattacharjee as Trisha Singh
Rasika Dugal as Satoshi Mondal
 Alok Ulfat as Nigel Paudwal

Production 
Pooja Shetty, Neil Pagedar and Anand Gandhi worked extensively through its research for three years and the team spent seven years for the work, with four years on developing the script which is touted to be an "entire universe of sequels, prequels, gaming, feature film, animation script and episodic content with multiple seasons".

The team filmed most of the series by March 2020 before the COVID-19 pandemic lockdown was announced, and in April 2020, the team reported the primary cast members Radhika Apte and Vijay Varma first to the news. They also planned to enter post-production which was delayed due to lockdown restrictions. The team spent four months for post-production as it features heavy visual effects. By early February 2021, the team had completed the post-production works.

Release 
The series was showcased to the officials of Disney+ Hotstar who eventually agreed for its distribution rights. On 8 March 2021, the first poster of the series was unveiled through social media platforms, followed by the trailer on 10 March 2021. The series was unveiled on Disney+ Hotstar on 26 March 2021 in Hindi and was dubbed in Tamil, Telugu, Malayalam, Kannada, Bengali and Marathi languages.

Accolades and Awards 
OK Computer was the first series to be screened at the Bright Future's section at the International Film Festival of Rotterdam 2021 and one of the only series to be screened in theatres at the New Zealand International Film Festival 2021.

Episodes

Reception 
Saibal Chatterjee of NDTV gave three out of five to the series, reviewing "OK Computer, made up of six episodes roughly 40 minutes each, is itself an extended cathartic joke. Persuasive and pulpy in the same sweep, it thrives on contradictory pulls. Sometimes uneven but always intriguing, it is programmed to blend piffle and tongue-in-cheek punditry in an unbridled flight of fancy." Nandini Ramanath of Scroll.in stated "OK Computer struggles in the wonderment department, but is perfectly at home tinkering with software and hardware and concluding that there is no better programme than human intelligence." Rohan Naahar of Hindustan Times stated "Besides adopting an absurdist tone that will alienate virtually all kinds of audiences, the new Hotstar series wastes its trump card Jackie Shroff." Ektaa Malik of The Indian Express gave three out of five stars stating "Even for those who like sci-fi, this Vijay Varma-Radhika Apte starrer would take some getting used to. But tide it out, as it is worth it." Pradeep Menon of Firstpost gave three out of five stating "Ok Computer is still immensely gripping, because you just never know what to expect. Some of the punchlines are so good yet so subtle, they’ll fly past you before you notice they were there. It also means that it is the kind of show that might be best appreciated with repeat viewings; because you’re absolutely missing a ton of stuff the first time around, so rapid are its mood swings."

References

External links 
 

Hindi-language Disney+ Hotstar original programming
2021 Indian television series debuts
Indian comedy television series
Hindi-language television shows
Indian science fiction television series